

F

The DST column shows the months in which Daylight Saving Time, a.k.a. Summer Time, begins and ends. A blank DST box usually indicates that the location stays on Standard Time all year, although in some cases the location stays on Summer Time all year. If a location is currently on DST, add one hour to the time in the Time column.

Notes
  Morocco temporarily suspends DST for the month of Ramadan.

References

  - includes IATA codes
 
 Aviation Safety Network - IATA and ICAO airport codes
 Great Circle Mapper - IATA, ICAO and FAA airport codes

F